Eremophila linsmithii is a plant in the figwort family, Scrophulariaceae and is endemic to Queensland. It is an erect shrub, branching from the base with narrow, sticky leaves, and white to pale lilac-coloured flowers and is found only in the south west corner of the state.

Description
The branches, leaves and sepals are sticky and shiny due to the presence of resin.

The petal tube is white to pale lilac-coloured and glabrous on the outside. The inside surface of some of the petal lobes is hairy and the inside of the tube is woolly. There are four stamens which are fully enclosed in the tube.

Taxonomy and naming
The species was first formally described by R.J.F. Henderson in 1978 and the description was published in Journal of the Adelaide Botanic Garden. The specific epithet (linsmithii) honours the Australian botanist, Lindsay Stuart Smith.

Distribution and habitat
Eremophila linsmithii is found along drainage lines and on stony slopes in the far south-western corner of Queensland, often growing in association with mulga and other eremophilas.

Conservation status
Eremophila linsmithii is classified by the Queensland Government as of "least concern".

Use in horticulture
This eremophila is a hardy shrub with bright green leaves and large flowers and is suitable for a low-maintenance garden. It can be propagated from cuttings and grown in most soils, including heavy clay and only needs the occasional watering during a long drought. It will tolerate light frosts and if damaged by a severe frost can be rejuvenated by pruning.

References

Flora of Queensland
linsmithii
Plants described in 1978
Taxa named by Rodney John Francis Henderson